The Kensington Lions Club All-Star High School Football Classic is a high school football all-star game held in the Buffalo metropolitan area. All stars from Western New York are assembled into a "North" team (mostly from Niagara County, New York) and a "South" team (mostly from Erie County, New York). The game does not draw players from the Southern Tier, due to the much less populated school districts in that territory; teams there instead participate in the Don Raabe Big 30 Charities Classic. Its location varies each year.

The 2012 contest was the 37th in the game's history. The South currently holds a 21-16 overall record; the North won three consecutive games between 2007 and 2009, while the South rebounded to win the 2010 and 2011 contests. The North won the 2012 contest.

References

High school football games in the United States
High school sports in New York (state)
Lions Clubs International